Lac de Villegusien (also known as Réservoir de la Vingeanne) is a lake in Haute-Marne, France. Its surface area is 1.99 km².

The Lac de Villegusien lies in the communes of Villegusien-le-Lac and Longeau-Percey.

Villegusien
Landforms of Haute-Marne